Paul Frederic Simon (born October 13, 1941) is an American musician, singer, songwriter and actor whose career has spanned six decades. He is one of the most acclaimed songwriters in popular music, both as a solo artist and as half of folk rock duo Simon & Garfunkel with Art Garfunkel.

Simon was born in Newark, New Jersey, and grew up in the borough of Queens in New York City. He began performing with his schoolfriend Art Garfunkel in 1956 when they were still in their early teens. After limited success, the pair reunited after an electrified version of their song "The Sound of Silence" became a hit in 1966. Simon & Garfunkel recorded five albums together featuring songs mostly written by Simon, including the hits "Mrs. Robinson", "America", "Bridge over Troubled Water" and "The Boxer".

After Simon & Garfunkel split in 1970, Simon recorded three acclaimed albums over the following five years, all of which charted in the Top 5 on the Billboard 200. His 1972 self-titled album contained the hit songs "Mother and Child Reunion" and "Me and Julio Down by the Schoolyard". The 1975 album Still Crazy After All These Years, which featured guest vocals from Garfunkel, was his first number one solo album. It featured the number 1 hit single "50 Ways to Leave Your Lover", among other Top 40 songs such as "Still Crazy After All These Years", "Gone at Last" and "My Little Town".

Simon reunited with Garfunkel for a performance in New York Central Park in 1981, drawing half a million spectators, followed by a world tour with Garfunkel. After a career slump, Simon released Graceland in 1986, an album inspired by South African township music. It sold 14 million copies worldwide, and remains his most popular and acclaimed solo work. A number of hit singles were released from the album, including "You Can Call Me Al", "The Boy in the Bubble" and "Diamonds on the Soles of Her Shoes". It won the Grammy Award for Album of the Year in 1987.

Simon continued to tour throughout the 1990s. He wrote a Broadway musical, The Capeman, and recorded a companion album, Songs from The Capeman, which was released in 1997. His 2000 album You're the One was nominated again for Album of the Year honors. He followed that album with several years of touring, including another reunion tour with Garfunkel. He then released Surprise (2006), his last album of the decade. In 2016, he released Stranger to Stranger, which debuted at number 3 on the Billboard Album Chart and number 1 the UK Albums Chart. It marked his greatest commercial and critical success in thirty years. His most recent album is In the Blue Light (2018), which contains re-arrangements of lesser-known songs from his prior albums.

Simon has earned sixteen Grammy Awards for his solo and collaborative work, including three for Album of the Year (Bridge Over Troubled Water, Still Crazy After All These Years and Graceland), and a Lifetime Achievement Award. He is a two-time inductee into the Rock and Roll Hall of Fame: first in 1990 as a member of Simon & Garfunkel, and again in 2001 for his solo career. In 2006 he was selected as one of the "100 People Who Shaped the World" by Time. In 2011, Rolling Stone named Simon one of the 100 greatest guitarists, and in 2015 he was ranked 8th in their list of the 100 Greatest Songwriters of All Time. Simon was the first recipient of the Library of Congress's Gershwin Prize for Popular Song in 2007.

Early life 
Simon was born on October 13, 1941, in Newark, New Jersey, to Hungarian-Jewish parents. His father, Louis (1916–1995), was a college professor, double-bass player and dance bandleader who performed under the name Lee Sims. His mother, Belle (1910–2007), was an elementary-school teacher. In 1945, his family moved to the Kew Gardens Hills section of Flushing, Queens, in New York City.

The musician Donald Fagen described Simon's childhood as that of "a certain kind of New York Jew, almost a stereotype really, to whom music and baseball are very important. I think it has to do with the parents. The parents are either immigrants or first-generation Americans who felt like outsiders, and assimilation was the key thought—they gravitated to black music and baseball looking for an alternative culture." Simon, upon hearing Fagen's description, said it "isn't far from the truth". Simon played baseball and stickball as a child. He described his father as funny and smart, but said he worked late and did not see his children much.

Simon met Art Garfunkel when they were both 11. They performed in a production of Alice in Wonderland for their sixth-grade graduation, and began singing together when they were 13, occasionally performing at school dances. 

At the age of 12 or 13 Simon wrote his first song, "The Girl for Me", for him and Art Garfunkel. According to Simon, it became the "neighborhood hit". His father wrote the words and chords on paper for the boys to use. That paper became the first officially copyrighted Paul Simon and Art Garfunkel song, and is now in the Library of Congress. In 1957, in their mid-teens, they recorded the song "Hey, Schoolgirl" under the name "Tom & Jerry", a name that was given to them by their label Big Records. The single reached number 49 on the pop charts.

After graduating from Forest Hills High School, Simon majored in English at Queens College and graduated in 1963, while Garfunkel studied mathematics education at Columbia University in Manhattan. Simon was a brother in the Alpha Epsilon Pi fraternity, and went on to attend Brooklyn Law School for one semester in 1963.

Career 

Between 1957 and 1964, Simon wrote, recorded and released more than 30 songs. He occasionally reunited with Garfunkel as Tom & Jerry for some singles, including "Our Song" and "That's My Story". Most of the songs Simon recorded during that time were performed alone or with musicians other than Garfunkel. They were released on minor record labels including Amy, Big, Hunt, King, Tribute and Madison. He used several pseudonyms for these recordings, usually "Jerry Landis", but also "Paul Kane" and "True Taylor". By 1962, working as Jerry Landis, he was a frequent writer/producer for several Amy Records artists, overseeing material released by Dotty Daniels, The Vels and Ritchie Cordell.

Simon enjoyed moderate success with singles as part of the group Tico and the Triumphs, including "Motorcycle", which reached number 99 on the Billboard charts in 1962. Tico and the Triumphs released four 45s. Marty Cooper, known as Tico, sang lead on several of these releases, but "Motorcycle" featured Simon's vocal. Also in 1962, Simon reached number 97 on the pop charts as Jerry Landis, with the novelty song "The Lone Teen Ranger". Both chart singles were released on Amy Records.

1960s: Simon & Garfunkel 

In early 1964, Simon and Garfunkel auditioned for Columbia Records, whose executive Clive Davis signed them to produce an album. Columbia decided that the two would be called Simon & Garfunkel instead of Tom & Jerry; according to Simon, this was the first time artists' surnames had been used in pop music without their first names. Simon and Garfunkel's first LP, Wednesday Morning, 3 A.M., was released on October 19, 1964. It consisted of 12 songs, five of which were written by Simon. The album initially flopped.

After the album release, Simon moved to England and performed in folk clubs. Simon enjoyed his time there. He said in 1970, "I had a lot of friends there and a girlfriend there. I could play music there. There was no place to play in New York City. They wouldn’t have me." In England, he produced Jackson C. Frank's first and only album and co-wrote several songs with Bruce Woodley of the Australian pop group the Seekers, including "I Wish You Could Be Here", "Cloudy" and "Red Rubber Ball". Simon also contributed to the Seekers' catalog with "Someday One Day", which was released in March 1966, charting around the same time as Simon and Garfunkel's "Homeward Bound". The song was a Top 10 hit from their second UK album, Sounds of Silence, and later included on their third U.S. album Parsley, Sage, Rosemary and Thyme.

Back on the American East Coast, radio stations began receiving requests for the Wednesday Morning, 3 A.M. track "The Sound of Silence". Simon & Garfunkel's producer, Tom Wilson, overdubbed the track with electric guitar, bass guitar and drums. It was released as a single, eventually reaching number 1 on the US pop charts. Wilson did not inform the duo of his plan, and Simon was "horrified" when he first heard it. The success drew Simon back to the US to reunite with Garfunkel, and they recorded the albums Sounds of Silence (1966), Parsley, Sage, Rosemary and Thyme (1966) and Bookends (1968). Their final album, Bridge over Troubled Water (1970), became at that time the bestselling album of all time.

Simon & Garfunkel also contributed to the soundtrack of the Mike Nichols film, The Graduate (1967), starring Dustin Hoffman and Anne Bancroft. While writing "Mrs. Robinson", Simon toyed with the title "Mrs. Roosevelt". When Garfunkel reported this indecision over the song's name to the director, Nichols replied, "Don't be ridiculous! We're making a movie here! It's Mrs. Robinson!" 

Simon and Garfunkel's relationship became strained, and they split in 1970. At the urging of his wife, Peggy Harper, Simon called Davis to confirm the duo's breakup. For the next several years, they spoke only two or three times a year.

1970–1976: Solo and Still Crazy After All These Years 
In 1970, Simon taught songwriting at New York University. He said he had wanted to teach for a while, and hoped to help people avoid some of the mistakes he had made: "You can teach somebody about writing songs. You can't teach someone how to write a song, I don't think ... I'd go to a course if the Beatles would talk about how they made records because I'm sure I could learn something."

Simon pursued solo projects, reuniting occasionally with Garfunkel for various projects. Actor Warren Beatty brought Simon into a solo performance at the Cleveland Arena in April 1972, a benefit concert for the George McGovern 1972 presidential campaign. After that, Beatty obtained the duo's agreement to reunite in mid-June at Madison Square Garden, another political concert called Together for McGovern. Garfunkel joined Simon again on the 1975 Top 10 single "My Little Town". Simon wrote it for Garfunkel, whose solo output Simon felt lacked "bite". The song was included on Simon's album Still Crazy After All These Years and Garfunkel's album Breakaway. Contrary to popular belief, the song is not autobiographical of Simon's early life in New York City. Simon also provided guitar on Garfunkel's 1973 album Angel Clare, and added backing vocals to the song "Down in the Willow Garden".

Simon's album Paul Simon was released in January 1972, preceded by his first experiment with world music, the Jamaican-inspired "Mother and Child Reunion". It reached both the American and British Top 5. The album received universal acclaim, with critics praising the variety of styles and the confessional lyrics, reaching number 4 in the U.S. and number 1 in the UK and Japan. It later spawned another Top 30 hit with "Me and Julio Down by the Schoolyard".

Simon's next project was the pop-folk album, There Goes Rhymin' Simon, released in May 1973. It contained some of his most popular and polished recordings. The lead single, "Kodachrome", was a number 2 hit in America. The follow-up, the gospel-flavored "Loves Me Like a Rock" was even bigger, topping the Cashbox charts. Other songs like the weary "American Tune", or the melancholic "Something So Right" (a tribute to Simon's first wife Peggy), became standards in the musician's catalog. Critical and commercial reception for this second album was even stronger than for his debut. The album reached number 1 on the Cashbox album charts. As a souvenir for the tour that came next, it was released as a live album, titled Live Rhymin' (1974). The album was moderately successful and displayed some changes in Simon's music style, adopting world and religious music.

Highly anticipated, Still Crazy After All These Years was his next album. Released in October 1975, and produced by Simon and Phil Ramone, it marked another departure. The mood of the album was darker, as he wrote and recorded it in the wake of his divorce. Preceded by the feel-good duet with Phoebe Snow, "Gone at Last" (a Top 25 hit) and the Simon & Garfunkel reunion track "My Little Town" (a number 9 on Billboard), the album was his only number 1 on the Billboard charts to date. The 18th Grammy Awards named it the Album of the Year, and Simon's performance the year's Best Male Pop Vocal. With Simon in the forefront of popular music, the third single from the album, "50 Ways to Leave Your Lover" reached the top spot of the Billboard charts, his only single to reach number 1 on this list. Simon put together a benefit show at Madison Square Garden to raise money for the New York Public Library on May 3, 1976. Phoebe Snow, Jimmy Cliff and the Brecker Brothers also performed. The concert produced over $30,000 for the Library.

1977–1985: One-Trick Pony and Hearts and Bones 
After three successful studio albums, Simon became less productive during the second half of the 1970s. He dabbled in various projects, including writing music for the film Shampoo, which became the music for the song "Silent Eyes" on the Still Crazy album, and acting (he was cast as Tony Lacey in Woody Allen's film Annie Hall). He achieved another hit in this decade, with the lead single of his 1977 compilation Greatest Hits, Etc., called "Slip Slidin' Away" (which reached number 5 in the United States).

In 1980, Simon released One-Trick Pony, his debut album with Warner Bros. Records and his first in almost five years. It was paired with the motion picture of the same name, which Simon wrote and starred in. Although it produced his last Top 10 hit with the upbeat "Late in the Evening" (also a number 1 hit on the Radio & Records American charts), the album did not sell well.

Simon & Garfunkel included eight songs from Simon's solo career on the set list for their September 19, 1981, concert in Central Park. Five of those were rearranged as duets. Simon performed the other three songs solo. The resulting live album, TV special and videocassette (later DVD) releases were all major hits. 

Simon released Hearts and Bones in 1983, without Garfunkel. This was a polished and confessional album that was eventually viewed as one of his best works, but achieved the lowest sales of Simon's career. Hearts and Bones included "The Late Great Johnny Ace", a song partly about Johnny Ace, an American R&B singer, and partly about slain Beatle John Lennon. In January 1985, Simon lent his talent to USA for Africa, and performed on the relief fundraising single "We Are the World".

1986–1992: Graceland and The Rhythm of the Saints 

In 1986, Simon was awarded an Honorary Doctor of Music degree from Berklee College of Music, where he has served on the board of trustees.

After Simon was given a bootlegged tape of mbaqanga, South African street music, he decided to record an album of South African music. Simon traveled to Johannesburg where he recorded with African musicians in early 1986. Additional sessions were held in April in New York. The sessions featured many South African acts, particularly Ladysmith Black Mambazo. Simon also collaborated with several American artists, singing a duet with Linda Ronstadt in "Under African Skies", and playing with Los Lobos in "All Around the World or The Myth of Fingerprints". Before leaving for Johannesburg, Simon contributed to "We Are the World", a charity single benefiting African famine relief.

Graceland became Simon's most successful studio album and his highest-charting album in over a decade. It is estimated to have sold more than 16 million copies worldwide. Graceland won the 1987 Grammy for Album of the Year. In 2006, the album was added to the United States' National Recording Registry as "culturally, historically or aesthetically important".

Following the success, Simon faced accusations that he had broken the cultural boycott imposed by the rest of the world against the apartheid regime in South Africa by organizations such as Artists United Against Apartheid, anti-apartheid musicians (including Billy Bragg, Paul Weller and Jerry Dammers), as well as James Victor Gbeho (then Ghanaian Ambassador to the United Nations), Simon denied that he had gone to South Africa to "take money out of the country", noting that he paid the black artists and split royalties with them, and was not paid to play to a white audience. The United Nations Anti-Apartheid Committee supported Graceland, as it showcased black South African musicians and offered no support to the South African government, but the African National Congress protested it as a violation of the boycott. The Congress voted to ban Simon from South Africa, and he was also added to the United Nations blacklist. He was removed from the blacklist in January 1987.

Dion's song "Written on the Subway Wall"/"Little Star" from Yo Frankie (1989), featuring Simon, peaked at number 97 in October 1990.

After Graceland, Simon extended his roots with the Brazilian music-flavored The Rhythm of the Saints. Sessions for the album began in December 1989, and took place in Rio de Janeiro and New York. It featured guitarist J. J. Cale, as well as many Brazilian and African musicians. The tone of the album was more introspective and relatively low-key, compared to the mostly upbeat numbers of Graceland. Released in October 1990, the album received excellent critical reviews and achieved very respectable sales, peaking at number 4 in the U.S. and number 1 in the UK. The lead single, "The Obvious Child" (featuring the Grupo Cultural Olodum), became his last Top 20 hit in the UK and appeared near the bottom of the Billboard Hot 100. Although not as successful as Graceland, The Rhythm of the Saints received a Grammy nomination for Album of the Year.

Simon's ex-wife Carrie Fisher said in her autobiography Wishful Drinking, that the song "She Moves On" is about her. It's one of several she claimed, followed by the line, "If you can get Paul Simon to write a song about you, do it. Because he is so brilliant at it."
 
The success of both albums allowed Simon to stage another New York concert. On August 15, 1991, almost a decade after his concert with Garfunkel, Simon staged a second concert in Central Park with African and South American bands. The success of the concert surpassed all expectations, and reportedly over 750,000 people attended one of the largest concert audiences in history. He later remembered the concert as "the most memorable moment in my career." The success of the show led to both a live album and an Emmy-winning TV special. In the middle, Simon embarked on the successful Born at the Right Time Tour, and promoted the album with further singles, including "Proof" (accompanied with a humorous video that featured Chevy Chase and Steve Martin). On March 4, 1992, he appeared on his own episode of MTV Unplugged, offering renditions of many of his most famous compositions. Simon and Garfunkel were inducted into the Rock and Roll Hall of Fame in 1990.

1993–1998: Paul Simon 1964/1993 and The Capeman 
After Unplugged, Simon's place in the forefront of popular music dropped notably. A Simon & Garfunkel reunion took place in September 1993, and in another attempt to capitalize on the occasion, Columbia released Paul Simon 1964/1993 in September. A three-disc compilation, it received a reduced version on the two-disc album The Paul Simon Anthology one month later. In 1995, he made news for appearing on The Oprah Winfrey Show, where he performed the song "Ten Years", which he composed specially for the tenth anniversary of the show. Also that year, he was featured on the Annie Lennox version of his 1973 song "Something So Right", which appeared briefly on the UK Top 50 once it was released as a single in November.

Since the early stages of the 1990s, Simon was fully involved in The Capeman, a musical that eventually opened on January 29, 1998. Simon worked enthusiastically on the project for many years and described it as "a New York Puerto Rican story based on events that happened in 1959—events that I remembered." The musical tells the story of real-life Puerto Rican youth Salvador Agron, who wore a cape while committing two murders in 1959 New York, and went on to become a writer in prison. Featuring Marc Anthony as the young Agron, and Rubén Blades as the older Agron, the play received terrible reviews and poor box office receipts.

Simon recorded an album of songs from the show, which was released in November 1997. It was received with very mixed reviews, though many critics praised the combination of doo-wop, rockabilly and Caribbean music that the album reflected. In commercial terms, Songs from The Capeman was a failure. Simon missed the Top 40 of the Billboard charts for the first time in his career. The cast album was never released on CD but eventually became available online.

1999–2007: You're the One and Surprise 
After The Capeman, Simon's career was again in an unexpected crisis. However, entering the new millennium, he maintained a respectable reputation, offering critically acclaimed new material and receiving commercial attention. Simon embarked on a North American tour with Bob Dylan in 1999, with each alternating as the headline act with a "middle section" where they performed together, starting on the first of June and ending September 18. The collaboration was generally well-received, with just one critic, Seth Rogovoy from the Berkshire Eagle, questioning the collaboration.

In an attempt to return successfully to the music market, Simon wrote and recorded a new album very quickly, with You're the One arriving in October 2000. The album consisted mostly of folk-pop writing combined with foreign musical sounds, particularly grooves from North Africa. While not reaching the commercial heights of previous albums, it managed to reach both the British and American Top 20. It received favorable reviews, and received a Grammy nomination for Album of the Year. He toured extensively for the album, and one performance in Paris was released to home video.

In the aftermath of the September 11 attacks, Simon sang "Bridge Over Troubled Water" on America: A Tribute to Heroes, a multi-network broadcast to benefit the September 11 Telethon Fund and performed "The Boxer" at the opening of the first episode of Saturday Night Live after September 11. In 2002, he wrote and recorded "Father and Daughter", the theme song for the animated family film The Wild Thornberrys Movie. The track was nominated for an Academy Award for Best Song.

In 2003, Simon and Garfunkel reunited once again when they received a Grammy Lifetime Achievement Award. This reunion led to a US tour—the acclaimed "Old Friends" concert series, followed by a 2004 international encore that culminated in a free concert at the Colosseum in Rome that drew 600,000 people. In 2005, the pair sang "Mrs. Robinson" and "Homeward Bound", plus "Bridge Over Troubled Water" with Aaron Neville, in the benefit concert From the Big Apple to The Big Easy – The Concert for New Orleans (eventually released as a DVD) for Hurricane Katrina victims.

In 2004, Simon's studio albums were re-released both individually and together in a limited-edition nine-CD boxed set, Paul Simon: The Studio Recordings 1972–2000. At the time, Simon was already working on a new album with Brian Eno called Surprise, which was released in May 2006. Most of the album was inspired by the September 11 terrorist attacks, the Iraq invasion and the war that followed. In personal terms, Simon was also inspired by turning 60 in 2001, which he humorously referred to on "Old" from You're the One. Surprise was a commercial hit, reaching number 14 on the Billboard 200 and number 4 in the UK. Most critics also praised the album, and many of them called it a comeback. Stephen Thomas Erlewine from AllMusic wrote that "Simon doesn't achieve his comeback by reconnecting with the sound and spirit of his classic work; he has achieved it by being as restless and ambitious as he was at his popular and creative peak, which makes Surprise all the more remarkable." The album was supported with the successful Surprise Tour from May to November 2006.

In March 2004, Walter Yetnikoff published a book called Howling at the Moon, in which he criticized Simon personally and for his tenuous business partnership with Columbia Records in the past. In 2007 Simon was the inaugural recipient of the Gershwin Prize for Popular Song, awarded by the Library of Congress, and later performed as part of a gala of his work.

2008–2013: So Beautiful or So What and touring 

After living in Montauk, New York, for many years, Simon relocated to New Canaan, Connecticut.

Simon is one of a small number of performers who are named as the copyright owner on their recordings (most records have the recording company as the named owner of the recording). This noteworthy development was spearheaded by the Bee Gees after their successful $200 million lawsuit against RSO Records, which remains the largest successful lawsuit against a record company by an artist or group. All of Simon's solo recordings, including those originally issued by Columbia Records, are currently distributed by Sony Records' Legacy Recordings unit. His albums were issued by Warner Music Group until mid-2010. In mid-2010, Simon moved his catalog of solo work from Warner Bros. Records to Sony/Columbia Records where Simon & Garfunkel's catalog is. 

In February 2009, Simon performed back-to-back shows in New York City at the Beacon Theatre, which had recently been renovated. Simon was reunited with Art Garfunkel at the first show as well as with the cast of The Capeman. Also playing in the band was Graceland bassist Bakithi Kumalo. In May 2009, Simon toured with Garfunkel in Australia, New Zealand and Japan. In October 2009, they appeared together at the 25th anniversary of the Rock and Roll Hall of Fame concert at Madison Square Garden in New York City. 

In October 2009, Dion performed "The Wanderer" with Simon at the 25th Anniversary Rock and Roll Hall of Fame Concert.

In April 2010, Simon & Garfunkel performed again in New Orleans at the New Orleans Jazz & Heritage Festival.

Simon released a new song called "Getting Ready for Christmas Day" on November 10, 2010. It premiered on National Public Radio, and was included on the album So Beautiful or So What. The song samples a 1941 sermon by the Rev. J. M. Gates, also entitled "Getting Ready for Christmas Day". Simon performed the song live on The Colbert Report on December 16, 2010. The first video featured J. M. Gates giving the sermon, and his church in 2010 with its display board showing many of Simon's lyrics. The second video illustrates the song with cartoon images.

In the premiere show of the final season of The Oprah Winfrey Show on September 10, 2010, Simon surprised Oprah and the audience with a song dedicated to her show lasting 25 years (an update of a song he did for her show's 10th anniversary).

Simon's album So Beautiful or So What was released on the Concord Music Group label on April 12, 2011. The album received high marks from the artist: "It's the best work I've done in 20 years". It was reported that Simon attempted to have Bob Dylan featured on the album.

Rounding off his 2011 World Tour (which included the United States, the UK, the Netherlands, Switzerland and Germany), Simon appeared at Ramat Gan Stadium in Israel in July 2011, making his first concert appearance in Israel since 1983. On the 10th anniversary of the September 11 attacks (September 11, 2011), Paul Simon performed "The Sound of Silence" at the National September 11 Memorial & Museum, site of the World Trade Center.

On February 26, 2012, Simon paid tribute to fellow musicians Chuck Berry and Leonard Cohen, who were the recipients of the first annual PEN Awards for songwriting excellence at the JFK Presidential Library in Boston, Massachusetts.

Simon released a 25th anniversary box set of Graceland on June 5, 2012. It included a remastered edition of the original album, the 2012 documentary film Under African Skies the original 1987 "African Concert" from Zimbabwe, an audio narrative The Story of Graceland told by Paul Simon, as well as other interviews and paraphernalia. He played a few concerts in Europe with the original musicians to commemorate the anniversary.

On December 19, 2012, Simon performed at the funeral of Victoria Leigh Soto, a teacher killed in the Sandy Hook Elementary School shooting.

On June 14, 2013, at Sting's Back to Bass Tour, Simon performed his song "The Boxer" and Sting's "Fields of Gold" with Sting.

In September 2013, Simon delivered the Richard Ellmann Lecture in Modern Literature at Emory University.

2014–2021: Stranger to Stranger and In the Blue Light 
In February 2014, Simon embarked on a joint concert tour titled On Stage Together with English musician Sting, playing 21 concerts in North America. The tour continued in early 2015, with ten shows in Australia and New Zealand, and 23 concerts in Europe, ending on April 18, 2015.

Simon appeared during the premiere week of The Late Show with Stephen Colbert on September 11, 2015. Simon, who performed "Me and Julio Down by the Schoolyard" with Colbert for his surprise appearance, had been promoted prior to the show as "Simon & Garfunkel Tribute Band Troubled Waters". Simon's additional performance of "An American Tune" was posted as a bonus on the show's YouTube channel.

In 2015, Dion released the single "New York Is My Home" with Simon.

Simon also wrote and performed the theme song for the comedian Louis C.K.'s show Horace and Pete, which debuted January 30, 2016. The song, which can be heard during the show's opening, intermission and closing credits, features only Simon's voice and an acoustic guitar. Simon made a cameo appearance onscreen in the tenth and final episode of the series.

On June 3, 2016, Simon released his thirteenth solo studio album, Stranger to Stranger via Concord Records. He began writing new material shortly after releasing his twelfth studio album, So Beautiful or So What, in April 2011.

Simon collaborated with the Italian electronic dance music artist Clap! Clap! on three songs: "The Werewolf", "Street Angel" and "Wristband". Simon was introduced to him by his son, Adrian, who was a fan of his work. The two met up in July 2011 when Simon was touring behind So Beautiful or So What in Milan, Italy. He and Clap! Clap! worked together via email over the course of making the album. Simon also worked with longtime friend Roy Halee, who is listed as co-producer on the album. "I always liked working with him more than anyone else," Simon noted. Following the release of the album, Simon noted that "showbiz doesn't hold any interest for me" and discussed future retirement, stating: "I am going to see what happens if I let go".

Simon performed "Bridge over Troubled Water" at the 2016 Democratic National Convention on July 25, 2016. He debuted a new version of "Questions for the Angels" with jazz guitarist Bill Frisell on The Late Show with Stephen Colbert on May 24, 2017.

On February 5, 2018, Simon announced his retirement from touring in a letter to fans, citing time away from family and the death of longtime guitarist Vincent Nguini as key factors. However, he did not rule out performing live altogether. At the same time, it was announced that he would embark on his farewell concert tour on May 16 in Vancouver, British Columbia, Canada, at Rogers Arena. Homeward Bound – The Farewell Tour encompassed shows across North America and Europe, and Simon played his final concert in Flushing Meadows Corona Park, Queens, New York, on September 22, 2018.

On September 7, 2018, Simon released his fourteenth solo studio album, In the Blue Light, consisting of re-recordings of selected lesser-known songs from his catalog (often altering their original arrangements, harmonic structures and lyrics).

Simon announced his return to the live stage to close San Francisco's Outside Lands festival on August 11, 2019. With an appearance at the Golden Gate Park event, he planned to donate his net proceeds to local environmental non-profit organization(s).

American Songwriter magazine honored Dion's "Song for Sam Cooke (Here in America)", featuring Simon, as the "Greatest of the Great 2020 Songs".

Simon sold his music publishing catalog to Sony Music Publishing on March 31, 2021. Simon was previously signed to Universal Music Publishing Group.

Songwriting 
In an in-depth interview reprinted in American Songwriter, Simon discusses the craft of songwriting with music journalist Tom Moon. In the interview, Simon explains the basic themes in his songwriting: love, family and social commentary (as well as the overarching messages of religion, spirituality and God in his lyrics). Simon explains the process of how he goes about writing songs in the interview: "The music always precedes the words. The words often come from the sound of the music and eventually evolve into coherent thoughts. Or incoherent thoughts. Rhythm plays a crucial part in the lyric-making as well. It's like a puzzle to find the right words to express what the music is saying."

Projects

Music for Broadway 
In the late 1990s, Simon wrote and produced a Broadway musical called The Capeman, which lost $11 million during its 1998 run. In April 2008, the Brooklyn Academy of Music celebrated Paul Simon's works, and dedicated a week to Songs From the Capeman with a good portion of the show's songs performed by a cast of singers and the Spanish Harlem Orchestra. Simon himself appeared during the BAM shows, performing "Trailways Bus" and "Late in the Evening". In August 2010, The Capeman was staged for three nights in the Delacorte Theatre in New York's Central Park. The production was directed by Diane Paulus and produced in conjunction with the Public Theater.

Film and television 
Simon has also dabbled in acting. He played music producer Tony Lacey, a supporting character, in the 1977 Woody Allen feature film Annie Hall. He wrote and starred in 1980's One Trick Pony as Jonah Levin, a journeyman rock and roller. Simon also wrote all the songs in the film. He also appeared on The Muppet Show (the only episode to use the songs of one songwriter). In 1990, he played the character of Simple Simon on the Disney Channel TV movie, Mother Goose Rock 'n' Rhyme.

In 1978, Simon made a cameo appearance in the movie, The Rutles: All You Need Is Cash.

He has been the subject of two films by Jeremy Marre, the first on Graceland, the second on The Capeman.

Simon was a guest on The Colbert Report promoting his book Lyrics 1964–2008 on November 18, 2008. After an interview with Stephen Colbert, Simon performed "American Tune".

Simon performed a Stevie Wonder song at The White House in 2009, at an event honoring Wonder's musical career and contributions.

In May 2009, The Library of Congress: Paul Simon and Friends Live Concert was released on DVD, via Shout! Factory. The PBS concert was recorded in 2007.

Simon appeared at the Glastonbury Festival 2011 in England.

Saturday Night Live 
Simon has appeared on Saturday Night Live 14 times, both as host and musical guest. He was the host for the second episode, which aired on October 18, 1975, following George Carlin, who hosted the first episode. SNL star Chevy Chase appeared in Simon's video for "You Can Call Me Al" lip syncing the song while Simon looks disgruntled and mimes backing vocals, with the playing of various instruments beside him. Chase also appeared in Simon's 1991 video for the song "Proof", with Steve Martin.

Simon appeared alongside George Harrison as musical guest on the Thanksgiving Day episode of SNL on November 20, 1976. The two performed "Here Comes the Sun" and "Homeward Bound" together, while Simon performed "50 Ways to Leave Your Lover" solo earlier in the show. On that episode, Simon opened the show performing "Still Crazy After All These Years" in a turkey outfit, since Thanksgiving was the following week. About halfway through the song, Simon tells the band to stop playing because of his embarrassment. After giving a frustrated speech to the audience, he leaves the stage, backed by applause. Lorne Michaels greets him positively backstage, but Simon is still upset, yelling at him because of the humiliating turkey outfit. This is one of SNLs most played sketches.

In one SNL skit from 1986 (when he was promoting Graceland), Simon plays himself, waiting in line with a friend to get into a movie. He amazes his friend by remembering intricate details about prior meetings with passers-by, but draws a complete blank when approached by Art Garfunkel, despite the latter's numerous memory prompts.

On an appearance in the late 1980s, he worked with the politician who shared his name, Illinois Senator Paul Simon.

On September 29, 2001, Simon made a special appearance on the first SNL to air after the September 11, 2001, attacks. On that show, he performed "The Boxer" to the audience and the NYC firefighters and police officers.

Simon and Lorne Michaels were the subjects of a 2006 episode of the Sundance Channel documentary series, Iconoclasts.

Simon appeared on the March 9, 2013, episode hosted by Justin Timberlake, as a member of the Five-Timers Club.

Simon closed the 40th anniversary SNL show on February 15, 2015, with a performance of "Still Crazy After All These Years". Simon also played a snippet of "I've Just Seen a Face" with Sir Paul McCartney during the special's introductory sequence. Much of the Thanksgiving episode from 1976 was shown during the prime-time special.

His most recent SNL appearance was on the October 13, 2018, episode hosted by Seth Meyers. He was the musical guest and it was his 77th birthday.

Awards and honors 

Simon has won 12 Grammy Awards (one of them a Lifetime Achievement Award) and five Album of the Year Grammy nominations (the most recent for You're the One in 2001). He is one of only six artists to have won the Grammy Award for Album of the Year more than once as the main credited artist. In 1998, he was entered in the Grammy Hall of Fame for the Simon & Garfunkel album Bridge over Troubled Water. He received an Oscar nomination for Best Original Song for the song "Father and Daughter" in 2002. He is also a two-time inductee into the Rock and Roll Hall of Fame, as half of Simon & Garfunkel in 1990 and as a solo artist in 2001.

Brit Awards

|-
| 1977
| Bridge over Troubled Water
| International Album
| 
|-
| 1987
| rowspan="2" | Paul Simon
| International Solo Artist
| 
|-
| 1991
| International Male Solo Artist
| 
|}

Grammy Awards

|-
| rowspan="5" | 1969
| Bookends
| Album of the Year
| 
|-
| rowspan="3" | "Mrs. Robinson"
| Record of the Year
| 
|-
| Song of the Year
| 
|-
| Best Pop Performance by a Duo or Group with Vocals
| 
|-
| The Graduate
| Best Score Soundtrack for Visual Media
| 
|-
| rowspan="6" | 1971
| rowspan="2" | Bridge over Troubled Water
| Album of the Year
| 
|-
| Best Pop Performance by a Duo or Group with Vocals
| 
|-
| rowspan="4" | "Bridge over Troubled Water"
| Record of the Year
| 
|-
| Song of the Year
| 
|-
| Best Arrangement, Instrumental and Vocals
| 
|-
| Best Contemporary Song
| 
|-
| rowspan="2" | 1974
| rowspan="2" | There Goes Rhymin' Simon
| Album of the Year
| 
|-
| Best Male Pop Vocal Performance
| 
|-
| rowspan="3" | 1976
| rowspan="2" | Still Crazy After All These Years
| Album of the Year
| 
|-
| Best Male Pop Vocal Performance
| 
|-
| "My Little Town"
| Best Pop Performance by a Duo or Group with Vocals
| 
|-
| 1977
| "50 Ways to Leave Your Lover"
| Record of the Year
| 
|-
| rowspan="2" | 1981
| "Late in the Evening"
| Best Male Pop Vocal Performance
| 
|-
| One-Trick Pony
| Best Score Soundtrack for Visual Media
| 
|-
| rowspan="4" | 1987
| rowspan="2" | Graceland
| Album of the Year
| 
|-
| Best Male Pop Vocal Performance
| 
|-
| Himself
| Producer of the Year, Non-Classical
| 
|-
| rowspan="2" | "Graceland"
| Song of the Year
| 
|-
| 1988
| Record of the Year
| 
|-
| rowspan="2" | 1992
| The Rhythm of the Saints
| Album of the Year
| 
|-
| Himself
| Producer of the Year, Non-Classical
| 
|-
| 2001
| You're the One
| Album of the Year
| 
|-
| 2006
| Surprise
| Album of the Year
| 
|}

In 2001, Simon was honored as MusiCares Person of the Year. The following year, he was one of the five recipients of the annual Kennedy Center Honors, the nation's highest tribute to performing and cultural artists.

In 2005, Simon was saluted as a BMI Icon at the 53rd Annual BMI Pop Awards. Simon's songwriting catalog has earned 39 BMI Awards including multiple citations for "Bridge over Troubled Water", "Mrs. Robinson", "Scarborough Fair" and "The Sound of Silence". As of 2005, he has amassed nearly 75 million broadcast airplays, according to BMI surveys.

In 2006, Simon was selected by Time Magazine as one of the "100 People Who Shaped the World".

In 2007, Simon received the first annual Library of Congress Gershwin Prize for Popular Song. Named in honor of George and Ira Gershwin, this award recognizes the profound and positive effect of popular music on the world's culture. On being notified of the honor, Simon said, "I am grateful to be the recipient of the Gershwin Prize and doubly honored to be the first. I look forward to spending an evening in the company of artists I admire at the award ceremony in May. I can think of a few who have expressed my words and music far better than I. I'm excited at the prospect of that happening again. It's a songwriter's dream come true." Among the performers who paid tribute to Simon were Stevie Wonder, Alison Krauss, Jerry Douglas, Lyle Lovett, James Taylor, Dianne Reeves, Marc Anthony, Yolanda Adams and Ladysmith Black Mambazo. The event was professionally filmed and broadcast and is now available as Paul Simon and Friends.

In 2010, Simon received an honorary degree from Brandeis University, where he performed "The Boxer" at the main commencement ceremony.

In October 2011, Simon was inducted into the American Academy of Arts and Sciences. At the induction ceremony, he performed "American Tune".

In 2012, Simon was awarded the Polar Music Prize.

Personal life 
When Simon moved to England in 1964, he met Kathleen Mary "Kathy" Chitty (born 1947) on April 12 at the first English folk club he played, the Railway Inn Folk Club in Brentwood, Essex (where Chitty worked part-time selling tickets). She was 16 and he was 22 when they began a relationship. Later that year, they visited the U.S. together, touring mainly by bus.

Kathy returned to England on her own, with Simon returning to her some weeks later. When Simon returned to the U.S. with the growing success of "The Sounds of Silence", Kathy, who was quite shy, wanted no part of the success and fame that awaited Simon so they ended their relationship. She is mentioned by name in at least two of his songs: "Kathy's Song" and "America". She is also referred to in "Homeward Bound" and "The Late Great Johnny Ace". There is a photo of Simon and Kathy on the cover of Simon's 1965 album The Paul Simon Songbook.

Simon has been married three times, first to Peggy Harper in 1969. They had a son, Harper Simon, in 1972, and divorced in 1975. Simon wrote about this relationship in the song "Train in the Distance" from his 1983 album Hearts and Bones.

In the late 1970s, Simon lived in New York City next door to Saturday Night Live creator Lorne Michaels, who has been described as Simon's "best friend" during the period.

He and Shelley Duvall lived together as a couple for two years until she introduced him to her friend Carrie Fisher; Simon and Fisher then became a couple. Simon's second marriage, from 1983 to 1984, was to Fisher. He proposed to her after a New York Yankees game. The song "Hearts and Bones" was written about their time together, and the song "Graceland" is believed to be about seeking solace from the end of the relationship by taking a road trip. A year after divorcing, Simon and Fisher resumed their relationship, which lasted for several years. 

Simon married singer Edie Brickell on May 30, 1992. They have three children: Adrian, Lulu, and Gabriel.

Simon and his younger brother, Eddie Simon, founded the Guitar Study Center sometime before 1973. The Guitar Study Center became part of The New School in New York City, sometime before 2002.

Simon is an avid fan of the New York Rangers ice hockey team, the New York Knicks basketball team and the New York Yankees baseball team.

Philanthropy 
Simon is a proponent of music education for children. In 1970, after recording his "Bridge Over Troubled Water", at the invitation of the NYU's Tisch School of the Arts, Simon held auditions for a young songwriters' workshop. Advertised in The Village Voice, the auditions brought hundreds of hopefuls to perform for Simon. Among the six teenage songwriters Simon selected for tutelage were Melissa Manchester, Tommy Mandel and rock/beat poet Joe Linus, with Maggie and Terre Roche (the Roche Sisters), who later sang back-up for Simon, joining the workshop in progress through an impromptu appearance.

Simon invited the six teens to experience recording at Columbia studios with engineer Roy Halee. During these sessions, Bob Dylan was downstairs recording the album Self-Portrait, which included a version of Simon's "The Boxer". Violinist Isaac Stern also visited the group with a CBS film crew, speaking to the young musicians about lyrics and music after Joe Linus performed his song "Circus Lion" for Stern.

Manchester later paid homage to Simon with her recorded song "Ode to Paul". Other musicians Simon has mentored include Nick Laird-Clowes, who co-founded the band The Dream Academy. Laird-Clowes has credited Simon with helping to shape the band's biggest hit, "Life in a Northern Town".

In 2003, Simon signed on as a supporter of Little Kids Rock, a nonprofit organization that provides free musical instruments and free lessons to children in public schools in the U.S. He sits on the organization's board of directors as an honorary member.

Simon is also a major benefactor and one of the co-founders, with Irwin Redlener, of the Children's Health Project and The Children's Health Fund which started by creating specially equipped "buses" to take medical care to children in medically under-served areas, urban and rural. Their first bus was in the impoverished South Bronx of New York City, but they now operate in 12 states including on the Gulf Coast. It has expanded greatly, partnering with major hospitals, local public schools and medical schools and advocating policy for children's health and medical care.

In May 2012, Paul Simon performed at a benefit dinner for the Turkana Basin Institute in New York City, raising more than $2 million for Richard Leakey's research institute in Africa.

For his 2019 performance at San Francisco's Outside Lands Music and Arts Festival, Simon donated his appearance fee to the San Francisco Parks Alliance and Friends of the Urban Forest.

Discography 

This discography does not include compilation albums, concert albums or work with Simon & Garfunkel.
Simon's solo concert albums often have songs he originally recorded with Simon & Garfunkel, and many Simon & Garfunkel concert albums contain songs Simon first recorded on solo albums.

Simon has a few songs that appear on compilation albums and nowhere else, such as "Slip Slidin' Away" which first appeared on the compilation album Greatest Hits, Etc. (1977) and has since been included in subsequent compilations such as Negotiations and Love Songs (1988).

Solo studio albums
 The Paul Simon Songbook (1965)
 Paul Simon (1972)
 There Goes Rhymin' Simon (1973)
 Still Crazy After All These Years (1975)
 One-Trick Pony (1980)
 Hearts and Bones (1983)
 Graceland (1986)
 The Rhythm of the Saints (1990)
 Songs from The Capeman (1997)
 You're the One (2000)
 Surprise (2006)
 So Beautiful or So What (2011)
 Stranger to Stranger (2016)
 In the Blue Light (2018)

Filmography

Broadway 
 Rock 'n Roll! The First 5,000 Years (1982) – revue – featured songwriter for "Mrs. Robinson"
 Asinamali! (1987) – play – co-producer
 Mike Nichols and Elaine May: Together Again on Broadway (1992) – concert – performer
 The Capeman (1998) – composer, co-lyricist and music arranger – Tony Nomination for Best Original Score
 The Graduate (2002) – play – featured songwriter

Bibliography

See also 
 List of songs written by Paul Simon

References

External links 

 
 
 
 

 
1941 births
20th-century American composers
20th-century American guitarists
20th-century American singers
21st-century American guitarists
21st-century American singers
American acoustic guitarists
American expatriates in the United Kingdom
American folk guitarists
American folk rock musicians
American folk singers
American folk-pop singers
American male comedy actors
American male composers
American male guitarists
American male pop singers
American male singer-songwriters
American people of Hungarian-Jewish descent
American pop guitarists
American rock guitarists
American rock singers
American rock songwriters
American street performers
American world music musicians
Brit Award winners
Brooklyn Law School alumni
Columbia Records artists
Fellows of the American Academy of Arts and Sciences
Fingerstyle guitarists
Forest Hills High School (New York) alumni
Gershwin Prize recipients
Grammy Award winners
Guitarists from New Jersey
Jewish American male actors
Jewish American musicians
Jewish American songwriters
Jewish folk singers
Jewish singers
Kennedy Center honorees
Living people
Musicians from Newark, New Jersey
Musicians from Queens, New York
People from Kew Gardens, Queens
People from Montauk, New York
People from New Canaan, Connecticut
Primetime Emmy Award winners
Queens College, City University of New York alumni
Record producers from New York (state)
Simon & Garfunkel
Singer-songwriters from New Jersey
Singers from New York City
Warner Records artists
Singer-songwriters from New York (state)
Singer-songwriters from Connecticut